Siguinvoussé is a village in the Sabcé Department of Bam Province in northern-central Burkina Faso. It has a population of 781.

References

Populated places in the Centre-Nord Region
Bam Province